The final round of the EuroBasket Women 2017 took place between 20 and 25 June 2017 with all games played at O2 Arena in Prague, except the qualification for quarter-finals with two games between the teams of group C and D at Kralovka Arena in Prague and two games between the teams of groups A and B were played at Zimní stadion Hradec Králové in Hradec Králové, Czech Republic.

Qualified teams
The group winners qualified for the quarterfinals while the runners-up and third placed teams advanced to the qualification round.

Bracket
5–8th place bracket

Qualification for quarterfinals

Quarterfinals

5–8th place semifinals

Semifinals

Seventh place game

Fifth place game

Third place game

Final

External links
Official website

Final round